A by-election for the Australian House of Representatives seat of Braddon took place on Saturday 28 July 2018, following the resignation of incumbent Labor MP Justine Keay. 

In early counting, within an hour of the close of polls, the Australian Broadcasting Corporation's psephologist Antony Green's electoral computer had predicted Labor to retain the electorate.

The by-election occurred on the same day as four other by-elections for the House of Representatives, colloquially known as Super Saturday.



Background
Due to the High Court ruling against Senator Katy Gallagher on 9 May 2018 as part of the ongoing parliamentary eligibility crisis, Keay and three other MPs in the same situation announced their parliamentary resignations later that day, while the Perth incumbent resigned for family reasons. The Speaker announced on 24 May 2018 that he had scheduled the by-elections to occur on 28 July 2018. Popularly labelled "Super Saturday", the occurrence of five simultaneous federal by-elections is unprecedented in Australian political history. The others are:
2018 Fremantle by-election
2018 Longman by-election
2018 Mayo by-election
2018 Perth by-election

A redistribution of the Tasmanian federal electoral divisions was completed in 2017, however by-elections are conducted under existing boundaries, as redistributed boundaries do not come into effect until the subsequent federal election.

Key dates
Key dates in relation to the by-election are:
 Thursday, 10 May 2018 – Speaker acceptance of resignation 
 Friday, 15 June 2018 – Issue of writ
 Friday, 22 June 2018 – Close of electoral rolls (8pm)
 Thursday, 5 July 2018 – Close of nominations (12 noon)
 Friday, 6 July 2018 – Declaration of nominations (12 noon)
 Tuesday, 10 July 2018 – Start of early voting
 Saturday, 28 July 2018 – Polling day (8am to 6pm)
 Friday, 10 August 2018 – Last day for receipt of postal votes
 Sunday, 23 September 2018 – Last day for return of writs

Candidates

Polling

Results

See also
July 2018 Australian federal by-elections
List of Australian federal by-elections
2017–18 Australian parliamentary eligibility crisis

References

External links
2018 Braddon by-election website: Australian Electoral Commission
2018 Braddon by-election guide: Antony Green ABC
2018 Braddon by-election guide: The Poll Bludger
2018 Braddon by-election guide: The Tally Room
By-elections aplenty: The Poll Bludger 10 May 2018
Super Saturday July 28: The Poll Bludger 24 May 2018

2018 elections in Australia
Tasmanian federal by-elections
2010s in Tasmania
July 2018 events in Australia